Democratic Front is a name used by political parties and alliances in several countries, such as:
Democratic Front (Albania)
Democratic Front for the Liberation of Angola
Democratic Front (Bosnia and Herzegovina)
Democratic Front (Cyprus)
Democratic Front Party (Egypt)
 Democratic Front (France)
Democratic Front (Georgia)
Democratic Front (Guinea-Bissau)
Democratic Front (India)
 Democratic Front (Italy)
Democratic Front (Montenegro)
Democratic Front for the Reunification of Korea (North Korea)
Democratic Front for the Liberation of Palestine
Democratic Front (Peru)
Democratic Front of National Unity (Peru)
Democratic Front for the Liberation of Togo

See also
National Front (disambiguation)
Popular Front (disambiguation)
Progressive Democratic Front (disambiguation)
United Front (disambiguation)